The 1911–12 season was the 17th season of competitive football in Belgium.

Overview
Daring Club de Bruxelles claimed their first ever silverware by winning the Division I. From this season on it was decided that the last two first division clubs would be relegated to the promotion, replaced by the top two clubs of the promotion. RC de Malines and Léopold Club de Bruxelles were thus relegated, replaced by FC Liégeois and CS Verviétois.

National team

* Belgium score given first

Key
 H = Home match
 A = Away match
 N = On neutral ground
 F = Friendly
 o.g. = own goal

Honours

Final league tables

Division I

Promotion

Play-off

|}

References
RSSSF archive - Final tables 1895-2002
Belgian clubs history 
Belgium Soccer History